The 2004 Campionati Internazionali di Sicilia was a men's tennis tournaments played on outdoor clay courts in Palermo, Italy that was part of the International Series of the 2004 ATP Tour. It was the 26th edition of the tournament and was held from 27 September until 3 October 2004. Eighth-seeded Tomáš Berdych won the singles title.

Finals

Singles

 Tomáš Berdych defeated  Filippo Volandri 6–3, 6–3
 It was Berdych's first singles title of his career.

Doubles

 Lucas Arnold Ker /  Mariano Hood defeated  Gastón Etlis /  Martín Rodríguez 7–5, 6–2

References

External links
 ITF tournament edition details

Campionati Internazionali di Sicilia
Campionati Internazionali di Sicilia
Campionati Internazionali di Sicilia